Bénédicte Evrard (born 21 March 1975) is a Belgian gymnast. She competed in five events at the 1992 Summer Olympics.

References

1975 births
Living people
Belgian female artistic gymnasts
Olympic gymnasts of Belgium
Gymnasts at the 1992 Summer Olympics
Sportspeople from Brussels